Ivan Fuksa (born 15 July 1963) is a Czech politician who served as Minister of Agriculture from 2010 to 2011 and member of the Chamber of Deputies from 2010 to 2012.

Fuksa graduated from the Transport and Communications University in Prague. He worked in the municipal transport company in Prague and after having returned to Příbram in 1988, he became teacher.

He was elected into Příbram city assembly in 1990 as the Civic Forum member. He co-founded Příbram's Civic Democratic Party (ODS), led it in the municipal elections and became Příbram's mayor in 2002. He replaced Josef Vacek in the seat.

In 2006, Fuksa's led ODS gained two more seats in the city assembly, but the party was not able to find a coalition partner and had to leave to opposition. Fuksa was replaced by new social-democratic mayor Josef Řihák, his former coalition partner.

On 29 January 2007 Minister of Finance Miroslav Kalousek named Fuksa his first deputy after the ODS nomination.

Fuksa is married again after divorcing once, has two children from his second marriage. He is an active athlete, he has participated in several sea-sailing competitions, climbed the top of Mont Blanc and finished several international marathons.

External links
 Fuksa's personal website  (in Czech)

1963 births
Living people
People from Příbram
Civic Democratic Party (Czech Republic) mayors
Mayors of places in the Czech Republic
Agriculture ministers of the Czech Republic
Civic Democratic Party (Czech Republic) Government ministers